The Deputy Chief Minister of Mizoram is a member of the Cabinet of Mizoram Government in the Government of Mizoram. Not a constitutional office, it seldom carries any specific powers. A deputy chief minister usually also holds a cabinet portfolio such as home minister or finance minister. In the parliamentary system of government, the Chief Minister is treated as the "first among equals" in the cabinet; the position of deputy chief minister is used to bring political stability and strength within a coalition government.

List

See also 
List of current Indian deputy chief ministers

References

Mizoram
Mizoram-related lists